Owen Keir Davidson (born 4 October 1943) is an Australian former professional tennis player of the 1960s and 1970s.

Alongside Billie Jean King, Davidson won eight grand slam mixed doubles titles. In 1967 he won a calendar year slam for mixed doubles, when he won the Australian Championships (with Lesley Turner Bowrey), and the French Championships, Wimbledon and the US Championships (with King).

Davidson became the first player to win a match in the open era of tennis when he defeated John Clifton in the first round of the British Hard Court Championships in Bournemouth played in April 1968.

His best grand slam singles result was at Wimbledon in 1966, when he reached the semifinals (beating top seed Roy Emerson before losing to Manuel Santana). He is also the 1972 Australian Open and the 1973 US Open men's doubles champion, partnering John Newcombe and Ken Rosewall. He was inducted into the International Tennis Hall of Fame in Newport, Rhode Island in 2010. He was inducted into the Australian Tennis Hall of Fame at the Rod Laver Arena in Melbourne on 26 January 2011 (Australia Day).

Grand Slam finals

Men's doubles: 6 (2–4)

Mixed doubles: 12 (11–1)

Career finals

Open-era doubles (10 wins, 10 losses)

References

External links 
 
 
 
 

Australian Championships (tennis) champions
Australian male tennis players
Australian Open (tennis) champions
French Championships (tennis) champions
Tennis players from Melbourne
International Tennis Hall of Fame inductees
United States National champions (tennis)
US Open (tennis) champions
Wimbledon champions
Wimbledon champions (pre-Open Era)
1943 births
Living people
Grand Slam (tennis) champions in mixed doubles
Grand Slam (tennis) champions in men's doubles
Professional tennis players before the Open Era
20th-century Australian people
21st-century Australian people